Bailes is an English-language surname. People with the name include:

 Alfred Shrapnell Bailes (1849–1928), Australian politician
 Alyson Bailes (1949–2016), British diplomat
 Barclay Bailes (1883–1955), Australian footballer
 Ernest Bailes (born 1982), American politician
 Ernie Bailes (1888–1964), Australian footballer
 Julian Edwin Bailes Sr. (1915–2010), American judge
 Margaret Bailes (born 1951), American athlete
 Scott Bailes (born 1961), American baseball player

See also 
 Bayles (name), another surname
 Bales, another surname
 Jerry Bails (1933–2006), American popular culturist and champion of comic books

English-language surnames
English toponymic surnames